MDJ may refer to:
Marietta Daily Journal, a periodical published in Maretta, Georgia, United States
Madras Municipal Airport, IATA airport code
Monthly Dragon Junior, a Japanese magazine
La Mujer de Judas, a Venezuelan telenovela